This is a list of electoral results for the Electoral district of Mount Margaret in Western Australian state elections.

Members for Mount Margaret

Election results

Elections in the 1920s

Elections in the 1910s

 Taylor had been elected unopposed at the 1914 election.

Elections in the 1900s

References

Western Australian state electoral results by district